The Phantom's Secret is a 1917 American silent mystery film directed by Charles Swickard and starring Hayward Mack, Mignon Anderson and Mark Fenton.

Cast
 Hayward Mack as Franz Leroux
 Mignon Anderson as Jeanne de Beaulieu
 Mark Fenton as Count de Beaulieu
 Daniel Leighton as The Rat
 Molly Malone as Jane Elliott
 Lee Shumway as Henry Marston
 Fred Church as Frank Van Dyke
 Nellie Allen as Sister
 Nanine Wright as Mrs. Lavinia Marston

References

Bibliography
 John T. Soister, Henry Nicolella, Steve Joyce. American Silent Horror, Science Fiction and Fantasy Feature Films, 1913-1929. McFarland, 2014.

External links
 

1917 films
1917 mystery films
American silent feature films
American mystery films
American black-and-white films
Universal Pictures films
Films directed by Charles Swickard
1910s English-language films
1910s American films
Silent mystery films